Garlic Island, or Island Park, is an island in Winnebago County, Wisconsin. The island is located in Lake Winnebago near its west shoreline.  The entirety of the island is in the town of Oshkosh. Garlic Island was the wintering site of a British Encampment during the War of 1812. This encampment was led by  Col. Robert Dickson, and suffered greatly during the winter of 1813.

References 

Lake islands of Wisconsin
Landforms of Winnebago County, Wisconsin